Ibragimovo (İbrahim) is a rural locality (a village) in Savaleyevsky Selsoviet, Karmaskalinsky District, Bashkortostan, Russia. The population was 388 as of 2010. There are 11 streets.

Geography 
Ibragimovo is located 26 km north of Karmaskaly (the district's administrative centre) by road. Savaleyevo is the nearest rural locality.

References 

Rural localities in Karmaskalinsky District